The Sustainable City Awards are a national "green business" awards scheme administered by the City of London Corporation. They aim to "recognise and reward best practice in environmental management and sustainable leadership" across twelve categories.

Categories

 Sustainable Finance
 Sustainable Travel and Transport
 Responsible Waste Management
 Resource Conservation
 Sustainable Building
 Sustainable Food
 Entrepreneurship (social)
 Entrepreneurship (commercial)
 Tackling Climate Change 
 Farsight Award
 Greening the Third Sector
 Air Quality
 Sustainable Fashion
 The Sir Peter Parker Award for leadership in sustainability is also awarded to one of the companies shortlisted in one or more of these categories.

History
The awards were established in 2001 attract around 250 applications per year, from SMEs and charities to multi-national banks and corporations. They launch each September and close for entry in November, entry details are on the City of London Corporation's website. The awards are free to enter and no charge is made for attending the awards ceremony, which takes place at Mansion House.

Accreditation
The awards are RSA accredited and winners are submitted for consideration as UK representatives in the "European Business Awards for the Environment" and are run in partnership with the following organisations:

 BCE Awards The Business Commitment to the Environmental (BCE) Environmental Leadership Awards scheme was the longest running, and one of the most prestigious environmental award schemes in the UK. They were founded by Sir Peter Parker in 1975 and truly recognise the importance of environmental excellence, innovation and leadership. The BCE Awards merged with the Sustainable City Awards in 2013.
 The British Fashion CouncilThe British Fashion Council was formed in 1983 out of the Fashion Industry Action Group. It aims to showcase British designers and develop London’s position as a major player in the international fashion arena, and is responsible for organising London Fashion Week, one of the highlights of the world fashion calendar.
 The Chartered Institute of Building (CIOB) is the international voice of the building professional, representing an unequalled body of knowledge concerning the management of the total building process. CIOB is making a hugely influential contribution in the development and continual improvement of educational standards in the built environment at a national and international level.
 Campaign for Better Transport fights for transport that improves quality of life and reduces environmental impact.
 Clean City Awards Scheme's objective is to raise the profile of effective waste management by recognising and rewarding good practice and encouraging the wider adoption of the principles of Reduce, Reuse and Recycle.
 City Bridge Trust is London's largest independent grant making trust, providing up to £17m a year for the voluntary and community sector to improve the lives of Londoners. Programmes benefit disabled people, children, young and older people as well as London’s environment.
 The Chartered Institute of Environmental Health was founded in 1883, the CIEH is a professional, awarding and campaigning body at the forefront of environmental and public health and safety in the UK.
 The Ecological Sequestration Trust is a new charity established in 2011. It aims to bring together world class scientists, engineers, planners, social and political experts and economists. The Trust aims to establish low carbon, economically attractive development pathways to improved water, energy and food security.
 Gresham College was founded by Sir Thomas Gresham in 1597 and is an independently funded educational institution supported by the Mercers’ Company and the City of London. Based in Barnard’s Inn, Holborn, in the centre of London, it has provided free lectures for the past 400 years delivered by its eight professors of astronomy, commerce, divinity, geometry, law, music, physic and rhetoric, and initiated the Royal Society.
 Institute for Sustainability is an independent charity established in 2009 to support cross sector collaboration and innovation. Their overall aim is to significantly accelerate the delivery of economically, environmentally and socially sustainable cities and communities. They do this by driving innovation and developing programmes to actively capture and share learning and best practice.
 The Environmental Research Group (ERG), part of the School of Biomedical and Health Sciences at King's College London, is a leading provider of air quality information and research in the UK.
 London Chamber of Commerce and Industry (LCCI) is the Capital’s biggest independent business support and networking organisation and represents the interests of thousands of London businesses. It provides professional, independent and affordable services to its members and is recognised as the ‘Voice of London Business’.
 London Sustainability Exchange (LSx) aims to accelerate the transition to a sustainable London by connecting and motivating people. They work in partnership with business, government and the voluntary and community sector to help overcome barriers to sustainable development in London.
 The UK Sustainable Investment and Finance Association (UKSIF) provide services and opportunities for their membership to align investment profitability with social and environmental responsibility. UKSIF’s aim is to ensure that the UK is the world leader in advancing sustainable development through financial services.
 The Worshipful Company of Chartered Surveyors was granted Letters Patent in May 1977. It is listed as Livery Company Number 85 out of a total list of 103 and is generally known as one of the Modern Livery Companies.
 The Worshipful Company of Environmental Cleaners aims to encourage and maintain high standards of practice and integrity through social and professional exchange, while supporting and promoting education, training and research projects within the Industry.
 The Worshipful Company of Fanmakers was originally convened to support fan makers in the 18th Century, this century has seen a closer association with the mechanical fan trade: the use of the fan in heating and in ventilation to begin with and later the use of fans in aircraft engines.
 The Worshipful Company of Launderers was founded in 1960, became a Livery Company in 1977. The Company promotes the profession of the launderers by awarding scholarships to laundry students.
 The Worshipful Company of Pattenmakers was once a trade association for the makers of pattens, undershoes of wood and metal strapped beneath their wearers’ shoes to raise them out of the mud of the streets. Today, its members run The Pattenmakers Company Charitable Foundation, a registered charity with a wide range of charitable purposes.
 The Worshipful Company of Water Conservators promotes the development and advancement of the science, art and practice of water and environmental management and the various scientific subjects related thereto.
 WRAP was founded in the UK in 2000. WRAP have the ambition of minimising resource use and diverting priority materials from landfill. This organisation are working to help recycling take off in the UK and to create a market for recycled materials. Over the last decade, WRAP have helped and continue to help governments devise strategies to deal with these issues utilising their expertise, research and practical advice.
 Z/Yen Group is the City of London’s leading commercial think-tank, founded to promote societal advance through better finance and technology. Z/Yen “asks, solves and acts” on strategy, finance, systems, marketing and intelligence projects in a wide variety of fields. Z/Yen activities include the development of an award-winning

See also

 List of environmental awards

References

External links
 Sustainable city awards
 The Ecological Sequestration Trust
 Institute for Sustainability
 King's College Environmental Research Group
 UK Sustainable Investment and Finance Association
 London Sustainability Exchange

City of London
Conservation in London
English awards
Environmental awards
Sustainable urban planning
Municipal awards
Awards established in 2001
2001 establishments in England